Kārlis Leilands (27 November 1895 – 12 December 1961) was a Latvian weightlifter. He competed at the 1924 Summer Olympics and the 1928 Summer Olympics.

References

External links
 

1895 births
1961 deaths
Latvian male weightlifters
Olympic weightlifters of Latvia
Weightlifters at the 1924 Summer Olympics
Weightlifters at the 1928 Summer Olympics